This is a list of yearly Indiana Intercollegiate Athletic Association football standings.

Standings

References

Indiana Intercollegiate Athletic Association
Standings